A sleeveless shirt is a shirt that is manufactured without sleeves or whose sleeves have been cut off. Depending on the style, they can be worn as undershirts, by athletes in sports such as track and field and triathlon, or as casual wear by both men and women.

Tank top 

In the United States and Canada, any casual sleeveless shirt can be called tank top or tank shirt, with several specific varieties. It is named after tank suits, one-piece bathing suits of the 1920s worn in tanks or swimming pools. The upper garment is worn commonly by both men and women. The build of a tank top is simple: the neck and armholes are often reinforced for durability. One usually has large armholes and neck holes and a neckline that can reach down as far as the bottom of the chest. (Women's tank tops have smaller holes, to conceal their breasts). They are also sometimes made long to make tucking into pants easier. In almost all cases, they are buttonless, collarless, and pocketless. 

A sleeveless T-shirt, also called a muscle shirt, is the same design as a T-shirt, but without sleeves. Some sleeveless T-shirts, which possess smaller, narrower arm holes, are traditionally worn by both women and men. They are often worn during athletic activities or as casual wear during warmer weather. They are colloquially known as shooter shirts in the southern United States. They were quite popular in the 1980s and were commonly associated with surfers and bodybuilders (hence the name "muscle" shirt) and often bore the names and logos of gyms. Such shirts without logos are now more commonly worn as casual wear.

The tank top designed for a tight fit and often made of ribbed cotton is also colloquially called a wifebeater, beater, or A-shirt, or more offensively a guinea tee or dago tee (guinea and dago being American ethnic slurs for people of Italian ethnicity).

The term wife-beater reportedly became synonymous for an undershirt after a 1947 criminal case where a Detroit man was arrested for beating his wife to death, and newspapers printed a photo of the "wife beater" wearing a stained undershirt. Another claim was spread by Paul Davidson, a film-maker, in a blog post where he claimed that the term had evolved from a medieval chain mail undergarment called a "waif-beater," and this was picked up as fact by other outlets. Davidson openly admitted in 2018 that the waif-beater story was bogus, created to trick people who believed unquestioningly anything they read on the Internet.

In the UK, especially when used as an undershirt, it is known as a vest (compare the American usage of vest). It is called a singlet in Australia and New Zealand, and a banian or banyan in the Indian Subcontinent.

In addition to athletic usage, tank tops have traditionally been used as undershirts, especially with suits and dress shirts. They are sometimes worn alone without a dress shirt or top shirt during very warm and/or humid weather. Tank tops are often worn alone under very casual settings, as lounge wear, and/or while completing yard work or other chores around the home.

Camisole

A camisole, also called just cami, is a sleeveless undergarment worn traditionally by women, normally extending to the waist. Camisoles often have spaghetti straps. Originally worn as an undershirt, like the A-shirt, they have become increasingly used as outerwear. The camisole is usually made of satin, nylon, or cotton.

Dudou

A dudou, known as a yếm in Vietnamese contexts, is an item of East Asian and Southeast Asian clothing resembling a silk apron or bib but traditionally used as an undershirt or bodice to flatten the figure and, medicinally, to preserve stomach qi. Beginning around the year 2000, Western and Chinese fashion has also begun incorporating them as a sleeveless and backless shirt for women.

Halter top

A halter top is a sleeveless shirt in which a strap goes around the back of the neck, leaving the upper back uncovered. Halter tops are worn mainly by girls and women.

Tube top

A tube top is a shirt with no sleeves or shoulders, essentially a tube that wraps around the wearer's torso. Some versions cover most of the torso while others leave a large midriff. In British and Australian English, they are informally known as boob tubes.

References

Shirts
Sleeves
Undergarments
1990s fashion
2000s fashion
2010s fashion